Eventide, an archaic word for evening, may also refer to:

 Eventide (EP), a 1998 EP by Monique Brumby
 Eventide (Magic: The Gathering), a 2008 trading card expansion set
 Eventide: A Scene in the Westminster Union, an 1878 painting by Hubert von Herkomer
 Eventide, Inc, an American audio, broadcast, and communications company
 "Eventide" (hymn), a hymn tune by William Henry Monk associated with the hymn "Abide with Me" by Henry Francis Lyte 
 Eventide, a 2004 novel by Kent Haruf